The Telenor Masters was a women's professional golf tournament on the Swedish Golf Tour, played between 2008 and 2010. It was held in Kungsbacka near Gothenburg, Sweden.

Teenage twins Jacqueline and Caroline Hedwall finished top at the inaugural event in 2008, played at Barsebäck Golf & Country Club, their home club.

The event moved to Kungsbacka in 2009, upon becoming hosted by Kungsbacka native and PGA Tour winner Fredrik Jacobson.

Winners

References

Swedish Golf Tour (women) events